Neuville-Saint-Vaast is a commune in the Pas-de-Calais department in the Hauts-de-France region of France. The Memorial was built on Hill 145, the highest point of the ridge to commemorate the battle and the Canadian soldiers who lost their lives during the First World War. The Memorial is also the site of the Canadian Cemetery No. 2, Neuville-St.-Vaast and Givenchy Road Canadian Cemetery, Neuville-St.-Vaast.

The Neuville-St Vaast German war cemetery (also called Maison Blanche) is the largest in France from WWI, with 44,833 buried here.

Geography
The A26 autoroute passes through the commune. Vimy Ridge rises from Neuville-St.-Vaast to its high point at Hill 145 (the location of the Canadian Memorial), where there is a steep drop off.

History
In World War I, Neuville-Saint-Vaast was the location of intense mining activity by the tunnelling companies of the Royal Engineers. In March 1916, the New Zealand Tunnelling Company relieved the French 7/1 compagnie d'ingénieurs territoriaux in the "Labyrinth" sector of the Western Front. The German "Labyrinth" stronghold was located near Neuville-Saint-Vaast, between Roclincourt and Écurie and not far from Notre Dame de Lorette. On 29 March 1916, the New Zealand Tunnelling Company exchanged position with the 185th Tunnelling Company and moved to Roclincourt-Chantecler, a kilometre south of their old sector.  The 176th Tunnelling Company  moved to Neuville-Saint-Vaast in April 1916 and remained there for a considerable time, as did the 172nd Tunnelling Company, which was relieved at Neuville-Saint-Vaast by the 2nd Australian Tunnelling Company in May 1916.

Population

Places of interest
 The church of St.Laurent, rebuilt, as was all of the village, after World War I.
 The Commonwealth War Graves Commission cemeteries.
 The nearby Canadian National Vimy Memorial
 The war memorial
 Neuville-St Vaast German war cemetery

Notable people
 Henri Gaudier-Brzeska, sculptor, died in the fighting here on the 5 June 1915.
 François Hennebique, an inventor of reinforced concrete, was born here on the 26 April 1842.

See also
 Communes of the Pas-de-Calais department
 Givenchy Road Canadian Cemetery
 Canadian Cemetery No. 2
 Neuville-St Vaast German war cemetery
 Battle of Vimy Ridge

References

External links

 Official website of the commune 
 The Commonwealth War Graves Commission British cemetery at Neuville-Saint-Vaast (La Targette)

Neuvillesaintvaast